LBT-3627 is an experimental peptide drug derived from vasoactive intestinal peptide (VIP) that can change the behavior of immune cells so they protect dopamine-producing cells rather than attacking them. The drug is being studied for its potential use for Parkinson's disease.

Function
LBT-3627 specifically targets the VIP2 receptor, unlike VIP. The drug also affects microglia. In addition, LBT-3627 is more durable in the body compared to VIP.

History and development
Scientists at the University of Nebraska Medical Center and Longevity Biotech, Inc. first demonstrated the use of the drug in mouse models.

A phase I trial for humans was planned for 2017, but as of 2018 it was still in the preclinical development stage.

References

Antiparkinsonian agents
Peptides
Receptor agonists